Bintuni Bay is the eastward extension or inner bay of Berau Gulf off Bird's Head Peninsula of New Guinea. Administratively it is part of West Papua, Indonesia.

Notes

Bays of Indonesia
Landforms of West Papua (province)
Landforms of Western New Guinea